See also: Droop nose (aeronautics)

The term droopsnoot or droop snoot has been variously applied to the following:

 The Lockheed P-38 Lightning (J variant)
 The Consolidated B-24 Liberator bomber
 The variable-angled nose of Concorde
 The Vauxhall Firenza HPF version automobile